Leslie Horton (12 July 1921 – January 2008) was an English professional footballer who played as a half-back in the Football League for Oldham Athletic, Carlisle United, York City, Halifax Town, in non-League football for Ashton United, and was on the books of Rochdale without making a league appearance. He was appointed player-manager of Ashton United in October 1952.

References

1921 births
Footballers from Salford
2008 deaths
English footballers
Association football midfielders
Rochdale A.F.C. players
Oldham Athletic A.F.C. players
Carlisle United F.C. players
York City F.C. players
Halifax Town A.F.C. players
Ashton United F.C. players
English Football League players
English football managers
Ashton United F.C. managers